22 Songs You'll Never Want To Hear Again is an album by Boston-based punk band Darkbuster. The album was self-released in 1999.

Track listing

References

1999 albums
Darkbuster albums